United Nations Security Council Resolution 120, adopted on November 4, 1956, considering the grave situation created by the Union of Soviet Socialist Republics in the suppression of the Hungarian people in asserting their rights, and the lack of unanimity of its permanent members, the Council felt it had been prevented from exercising its responsibility for the maintenance of international peace and security.  As a solution the Council decided to call an emergency special session of the General Assembly in order to make appropriate recommendations.

The resolution was adopted with 10 votes in favour to one against, from the Soviet Union.

See also
 List of United Nations Security Council Resolutions 101 to 200 (1953–1965)
 The Hungarian Revolution of 1956

References
 Text of the Resolution at undocs.org

External links
 

 0120
Hungarian Revolution of 1956
 0120
 0120
Hungary–Soviet Union relations
1956 in Hungary
1956 in the Soviet Union
November 1956 events